5027 Androgeos  is a large Jupiter trojan from the Greek camp, approximately  in diameter. It was discovered on 21 January 1988, by American astronomer Carolyn Shoemaker at the Palomar Observatory in California. The dark D-type asteroid is one of the 70 largest Jupiter trojans and has a rotation period of 11.4 hours. It was named from Greek mythology after the warrior Androgeos, who was killed by Aeneas.

Orbit and classification 

Androgeos is a dark Jovian asteroid orbiting in the leading Greek camp at Jupiter's  Lagrangian point, 60° ahead of the Gas Giant's orbit in a 1:1 resonance . It is also a non-family asteroid in the Jovian background population.

It orbits the Sun at a distance of 4.95–5.65 AU once every 12 years and 3 months (4,459 days; semi-major axis of 5.30 AU). Its orbit has an eccentricity of 0.07 and an inclination of 31° with respect to the ecliptic. The body's observation arc begins with its official discovery observation at Palomar.

Naming 

This minor planet was named by the discoverer from Greek mythology after Androgeos, the Greek warrior who was killed by Aeneas in the burning city of Troy. Aeneas and his Trojan men then took the armor of Androgeos and his killed troops to disguised themselves and escape to safety. The official naming citation was published by the Minor Planet Center on 4 June 1993.

Physical characteristics 

Androgeos has been characterized as a dark D-type asteroid by Pan-STARRS' survey and in the SDSS-based taxonomy.

Rotation period 

In May 2016, a rotational lightcurve of Androgeos was obtained from photometric observations by Robert Stephens at the Center for Solar System Studies in California. Lightcurve analysis gave a rotation period of  hours with a brightness amplitude of 0.37 magnitude.

This result supersedes similar period determinations with an amplitude of 0.31 and 0.64 by Stefano Mottola (1992) Stephens (2015), respectively.

Diameter and albedo 

According to the survey carried out by the Infrared Astronomical Satellite IRAS and the NEOWISE mission of NASA's Wide-field Infrared Survey Explorer, Androgeos measures 57.86 and 59.79 kilometers in diameter and its surface has an albedo of 0.091 and 0.071, respectively. The Collaborative Asteroid Lightcurve Link derives an albedo of 0.0767 and a diameter of 57.68 kilometers based on an absolute magnitude of 9.6.

Notes

References

External links 
 Lightcurve Database Query (LCDB), at www.minorplanet.info
 Dictionary of Minor Planet Names, Google books
 Discovery Circumstances: Numbered Minor Planets (5001)-(10000) – Minor Planet Center
 Asteroid 5027 Androgeos at the Small Bodies Data Ferret
 
 

005027
Discoveries by Carolyn S. Shoemaker
Named minor planets
19880121